Pahnavar or Pehnavar or Pahnvar, also rendered as Pahnevar, may refer to:
 Pahnavar, East Azerbaijan
 Pahnavar, Hamadan
 Pahnavar, Mazandaran